Patrick "Patsy" Groogan is an Irish republican politician.

Based in Ballinascreen, Groogan became a sports coach with a particular involvement in hurling.  He became prominent in his local Gaelic Athletic Association, and joined Sinn Féin. In 1991, Bernard O'Hagan, a Sinn Féin councillor for the Sperrin area of the Magherafelt District Council, was assassinated, and Groogan was appointed as his replacement.

Groogan held the Sperrin seat, heading the poll in each council election from 1993 to 2005. He became the first Sinn Féin Chairperson of Magherafelt District Council, and served a second term starting in 2004. He was elected to the Northern Ireland Forum in Mid Ulster, but he did not stand in the subsequent 1998 Northern Ireland Assembly election.

In 2006, Groogan resigned from Sinn Féin, along with Oliver Hughes, but continued to sit on the council as an independent.  Hughes described their resignations as "purely a domestic issue", but the Sunday Times speculated that they may have been in protest at a lack of internal party democracy.

References

Place of birth missing (living people)
Year of birth missing (living people)
Living people
Members of the Northern Ireland Forum
Independent politicians in Northern Ireland
Sinn Féin politicians
Sports coaches from Northern Ireland
Sinn Féin councillors in Northern Ireland
Members of Magherafelt District Council